Jacob Wallenberg (born 13 January 1956) is a Swedish banker and industrialist, currently serving as a board member for multiple companies. The Guardian has once quoted him as the prince in Sweden's royal family of finance.

Biography

Early life
Wallenberg was born in 1956 in Stockholm. His father, Peter Wallenberg, Sr., was a banker. His mother is Suzanne Fleming Grevillius. He is a member of the prominent Swedish Wallenberg family.

Education 
Wallenberg holds a B.Sc. Economics and M.B.A. from the Wharton Business School, University of Pennsylvania. Wallenberg attended the Royal Swedish Naval Academy and is today an Officer in the Royal Swedish Naval Reserve.

Career
Jacob Wallenberg was the Chairman of Skandinaviska Enskilda Banken. (SEB) from 1998 to 2005 and Vice Chairman from 2005 to 2014. He was the CEO of the Bank in 1997 and EvP and in charge of Corporate and Investment banking 1995-1996. Wallenberg has been Vice Chairman of Atlas Copco, SAS Group, Stora Enso and served on the board of The Coca-Cola Company, Electrolux, WM-data and Stockholm Chamber of Commerce.

Jacob Wallenberg is Chairman of the Board of Investor AB, a lead shareholder of Nordic-based global companies. He is Vice Chairman of ABB, Ericsson AB, FAM AB and Patricia Industries. Wallenberg also serves on the Board of Nasdaq Inc. Knut and Alice Wallenberg Foundation and a couple of other Wallenberg Foundations and Stockholm School of Economics. He is a member of the steering committee of Bilderberg Group, ERT, the European Round Table of Industrialists and the advisory board of Tsinghua University School of Economics and Management. He is also member of the Trilateral Commission. Wallenberg is Honorary Chairman of IBLAC, the Mayor of Shanghai’s International Business Leaders Advisory Council.

Honours
 Commander of the Order of the Lion of Finland
Commander of the Order of May, Argentina
Member of The Royal Swedish Academy of Engineering Sciences (2000)
Honorary Doctor of Economics, Stockholm School of Economics (2005)
Member of The Royal Swedish Society of Naval Sciences (2006)
H. M. The King's Medal, 12th size gold medal on Seraphim Order ribbon (2007)
Honorary Doctor of Economics, Hanken School of Economics, Helsinki, (2009)
SSE Research Award, Stockholm School of Economics Institute for Research (2010)
 Order of the Rising Sun, 2nd Class, Gold and Silver Star (2018)
Legion of Honour, France (2019)

See also
 Wallenberg family

References

Living people
1956 births
Directors of The Coca-Cola Company
Members of the Steering Committee of the Bilderberg Group
Swedish businesspeople
Jacob
Royal Swedish Yacht Club sailors
Swedish Navy officers
Recipients of the Order of the Rising Sun, 2nd class
Wharton School of the University of Pennsylvania alumni
Stockholm School of Economics alumni